Appleby may refer to:

People
 Appleby (surname)

Places

Australasia
 Appleby, New Zealand, a village near Nelson

England
 Appleby, Lincolnshire, a village in Lincolnshire
 Appleby-in-Westmorland, a town in Cumbria
 Appleby (UK Parliament constituency), a former Parliamentary borough including Appleby-in-Westmorland
 Appleby Magna, a village and parish in Leicestershire
 Appleby Parva, a village in the parish of Appleby Magna
 Appleby Lodge, a set of eight 1930s blocks of flats in Rusholme, Manchester

North America
 Appleby, Codington County, South Dakota, an unincorporated town in the United States
 Appleby, Ontario, a community in Burlington, Ontario, Canada
 Appleby, Texas, a city in the United States
 Appleby Corner, Ontario
 Appleby GO Station, a train and bus station in Ontario, Canada

Organisations and companies
 Appleby (law firm), formerly known as Appleby Spurling Hunter, an offshore legal service provider
 Appleby College, an independent day/boarding school in Oakville, Ontario, Canada

Other uses
 Appleby railway station (disambiguation)
 Appleby Horse Fair, an annual gathering of Gypsies and Travellers in Appleby-in-Westmorland
 USS Appleby, a fictional United States Navy destroyer that is the setting for the television series Ensign O'Toole

See also
 Applebee's, large U.S. restaurant chain